Polozovo is a rural locality (a selo) and the administrative center of Polozovoskoye Rural Settlement, Bolshesosnovsky District, Perm Krai, Russia. The population was 269 as of 2010. There are 7 streets.

Geography 
Polozovo is located 40 km south of Bolshaya Sosnova (the district's administrative centre) by road. Krasny Yar is the nearest rural locality.

References 

Rural localities in Bolshesosnovsky District